In Greek mythology, Phoenix or Phoinix (Ancient Greek: Φοῖνιξ Phoinix, gen.: Φοίνικος means "sun-red") was the eponym of Phoenicia who together with his brothers were tasked to find their abducted sister Europa.

Family 
Phoenix was a son of King Agenor of Tyre by either Telephassa, Argiope, Antiope, Damno or Tyro. He was the brother of Europa, Cadmus, Cilix, Syros, Isaia and Melia.

In some accounts, Phoenix's father was called King Belus of Eypt and sibling to Agenor, Phineus, Aegyptus, Danaus and Ninus. In the latter's version of the myth, Phoenix' mother could be identified as Achiroe, naiad daughter of the river-god Nilus.

Phoenix was believed to have fathered a number of children with different women. By Cassiopeia, Phoenix had a daughter, Carme, and three sons: Cilix, Phineus, and Doryclus, as well as a stepson Atymnius, whose natural father was Zeus; by Alphesiboea, he had Adonis. Phoenix was also credited as the father of Cepheus, king of Ethiopia, whose wife was another Cassiopeia.

According to early accounts, Europa was not Phoenix's sister, but his daughter, while Cadmus was identified as his son. Otherwise, Europa was called one of his two daughters by Perimede, daughter of Oeneus, the other one being Astypalaea; she was also included on the list of Phoenix's children by Telephe, her siblings in this case being Peirus, Phoenice, and Astypale (apparently identical to the aforementioned Astypalaea).

Telephe, daughter of Epimedusa, was probably the same as Telephassa, whom Moschus called Phoenix's wife and not his mother. In another account, his children were Cadmus, Europa and Thasus.

Mythology 
When Europa was carried off by Zeus, her three brothers were sent out by Agenor to find her, but the search was unsuccessful. Phoenix eventually settled in a country in Asia or ?Africa, which he named Phoenicia after himself. He was said to have founded Bithynia which was previously named Mariandyna.

Malalas recounted following account about Phoenix and Heracles the Tyrian:"Herakles the philosopher, called the Tyrian, lived in the reign of King Phoenix. It was he who discovered the purple-shell. He was wandering on the coastal part of Tyre city when he saw a shepherd dog eating the so-called purple-shell, which is a small maritime species like a sea snail. The shepherd thought the dog was bleeding, and took a clump of sheep’s wool and wiped off what was coming out of the dog’s mouth, and it dyed the wool. Herakles noticed that it wasn’t blood but the virtue of a strange dye, and wondered at it. Recognizing that the dye deposited on the wool came from the purple-shell, and having taken the wool from the shepherd as a great gift, he brought it to Phoenix, the King of Tyre. He too was surprised by the sight of the strange color of the dye. Admiring his discovery, he ordered that wool be dyed from this purple-shell dye and become a royal mantle for him. He was the first to wear this purple mantle, and everyone marveled at his royal raiment, as a foreign spectacle. From then, King Phoenix commanded that no one under his rule dare to wear such virtuous clothing on land or sea, except himself and those who ruled Phoenicia after him, so that they would recognize the King in the army and the crowd from his marvelous and strange clothing."

Genealogical table

Argive family tree

Notes

References
 Antoninus Liberalis, The Metamorphoses of Antoninus Liberalis translated by Francis Celoria (Routledge 1992). Online version at the Topos Text Project.
Apollodorus, The Library with an English Translation by Sir James George Frazer, F.B.A., F.R.S. in 2 Volumes, Cambridge, MA, Harvard University Press; London, William Heinemann Ltd. 1921. ISBN 0-674-99135-4. Online version at the Perseus Digital Library. Greek text available from the same website.
Conon, Fifty Narrations, surviving as one-paragraph summaries in the Bibliotheca (Library) of Photius, Patriarch of Constantinople translated from the Greek by Brady Kiesling. Online version at the Topos Text Project.
Fowler, Robert. L. (2000), Early Greek Mythography: Volume 1: Text and Introduction, Oxford University Press, 2000. .
 Gaius Julius Hyginus, Astronomica from The Myths of Hyginus translated and edited by Mary Grant. University of Kansas Publications in Humanistic Studies. Online version at the Topos Text Project.
Gaius Julius Hyginus, Fabulae from The Myths of Hyginus translated and edited by Mary Grant. University of Kansas Publications in Humanistic Studies. Online version at the Topos Text Project.
Gantz, Timothy, Early Greek Myth: A Guide to Literary and Artistic Sources, Johns Hopkins University Press, 1996, Two volumes:  (Vol. 1),  (Vol. 2).
Homer, The Iliad with an English Translation by A.T. Murray, Ph.D. in two volumes. Cambridge, MA., Harvard University Press; London, William Heinemann, Ltd. 1924. . Online version at the Perseus Digital Library.
Homer, Homeri Opera in five volumes. Oxford, Oxford University Press. 1920. . Greek text available at the Perseus Digital Library.
Pausanias, Description of Greece with an English Translation by W.H.S. Jones, Litt.D., and H.A. Ormerod, M.A., in 4 Volumes. Cambridge, MA, Harvard University Press; London, William Heinemann Ltd. 1918. . Online version at the Perseus Digital Library
Pausanias, Graeciae Descriptio. 3 vols. Leipzig, Teubner. 1903.  Greek text available at the Perseus Digital Library.

Princes in Greek mythology
Kings of Tyre
Kings in Greek mythology
Agenorides
Phoenician characters in Greek mythology
Family of Adonis